Dioryctria assamensis is a species of snout moth in the genus Dioryctria. It was described by Akira Mutuura in 1971 and is known from Assam, India, from which its species epithet is derived.

The larvae feed on Pinus khasya. They bore in the shoots of their host plant.

References

Moths described in 1971
assamensis